Ilbiidae is a family of marine opisthobranch gastropod mollusks in the superfamily Runcinoidea  

This family has no subfamilies according to the taxonomy of the Gastropoda by Bouchet & Rocroi, 2005.

Genera
 Fofinha Moro & Ortea, 2015
 Ilbia Burn, 1963, with two species (Australia, Marianas)

References

External links